Barbara Kirch Abington Township, Montgomery County, Pennsylvania) an American Olympic rower who competed in both the 1984 and 1988 Olympic coxless pair contests. In the 1988 Olympics, she competed with Mara Keggi. Kirch graduated from the University of Pennsylvania in 1984 with a B.A. Degree. After the Olympics, she eventually became the head rowing coach for the Penn Women's Rowing Team.

References

Rowers at the 1984 Summer Olympics
Rowers at the 1988 Summer Olympics
1960 births
People from Abington Township, Montgomery County, Pennsylvania
Olympic rowers of the United States
American female rowers
Living people
World Rowing Championships medalists for the United States
21st-century American women